KUOT-CD, virtual and UHF digital channel 21 is a low-powered, Class A 3ABN-affiliated television station licensed to Oklahoma City, Oklahoma, United States. Founded March 7, 1995, the station is owned by The Edge Spectrum, Inc.

Digital television

Digital channels
The station's digital channel is multiplexed:

References

External links

UOT-CD
Television channels and stations established in 1995
Low-power television stations in the United States